Gandamia  is a rural commune of the Cercle of Douentza in the Mopti Region of Mali. The commune contains eight villages and in the 2009 census had a population of 7,215. The chef-lieu is the small village of Kikara.

References

External links
.
.

Communes of Mopti Region